Diallo (pronounced ;) is a transcription of an African surname of Fula origin (English transcriptions are Jalloh and Jallow; the Portuguese and Creole transcription is Djaló). It is one of several common surnames used among the Fula.

The name may refer to:

People

Surname
Abdul Diallo (born 1996), Burkinabé footballer
Alpha Yaya Diallo, Guinean-Canadian guitarist, singer and songwriter
Amad Diallo (born 2002), Ivorian footballer
Amadou Diallo, victim of police shooting in New York City in 1999
Amadou Diallo (footballer) (born 1994), Guinean footballer
Aminata Diallo (born 1995), French footballer
Anthony Diallo (born 1956), Tanzanian politician 
Assane Diallo (born 1975), Senegalese runner
Ayuba Suleiman Diallo, (1701–1773), Muslim victim of the Atlantic slave trade
Boubacar Diallo (filmmaker), Burkinabé filmmaker and writer
Boubacar Telli Diallo (1926–1976), Guinean Minister of Justice, magistrate and lawyer
Boubacar Yacine Diallo (born 1955), Guinean journalist, writer and government minister
Boubacar Diallo (footballer) (born 1985), Guinean footballer
Boubacar Diallo (athlete) (born 1960), Senegalese sprinter
Boucader Diallo, Malian footballer
Cellou Dalein Diallo, Guinean former Prime Minister, Economist and politician
Cheick Diallo (born 1996), Malian basketball player
Delphine Diallo (born 1977), French-Senegalese photographer
Drissa Diallo, Guinean-French footballer
Gabriel Diallo, Canadian tennis player
Hama Arba Diallo, Burkinabé politician
Hamed Modibo Diallo (born 1976), Ivorian footballer
Hamidou Diallo (born 1998), American basketball player
Ibrahima Diallo (1915–1958), Senegalese politician
Ibrahima Diallo (born 1959), Senegalese judoka
Ibrahima Diallo (born 1985), Guinean footballer
Ibrahima Diallo (born 1993), English Paralympic footballer
Ibrahima Diallo (born 1999), French footballer
Ibrahim Diallo (footballer) (born 1996), Malian footballer
Khadidiatou Diallo, Senegalese activist
Lassana Diallo (born 1984), Malian footballer
Mamadou Alimou Diallo (born 1984), Guinean footballer
Mamadou Diallo (born 1971), Senegalese football striker
Mamadou Diallo (athlete) (born 1954), Senegalese triple jumper
Mamadou Diallo (Malian footballer) (born 1982), Malian retired footballer
Mamadou Sylla Diallo (born 1994), Senegalese footballer
Marcel Diallo (born 1972), American musician, poet, artist and activist
Mariam Aladji Boni Diallo Beninese politician
Mohamed Ali Diallo (born 1978), Burkinabé footballer
Mohammed Diallo (born 1983), Ivorian footballer
Nafissatou Niang Diallo (1941–1982), Senegalese writer
Nkechi Amare Diallo (born Rachel Anne Dolezal), American civil rights activist
Omar Diallo (born 1972), Senegalese footballer
Rabiatou Sérah Diallo (born 1949) Guinean trade unionist
Rokhaya Diallo (born 1978), French journalist, author, filmmaker, and activist
Saifoulaye Diallo (1923–1981), Guinean politician
Salif Diallo (1957–2017), Burkinabé politician 
Sidibé Aminata Diallo (born 1950, Malian academic and politician
Yaya Diallo (born 1946), Malian musician and author
Youssouf Diallo (Guinean footballer) (born 1984), Guinean footballer

First name
Diallo Guidileye (born 1989), Mauritanian-French footballer
Diallo Telli (1925–1977), Guinean diplomat and politician

Reference

Surnames of Mauritanian origin
Fula surnames
Muslim communities lists
Surnames of Burkinabé origin